Orgibet is a commune in the Ariège department in South-Western France.

Population
Inhabitants of the area are called Orgibetois.

See also
Communes of the Ariège department

References

Communes of Ariège (department)
Ariège communes articles needing translation from French Wikipedia